In Spain, the national 2011 "Ley de la Ciencia, la Tecnología y la Innovación" (Science, Technology and Innovation Act) requires open access publishing for research that has been produced with public funding. The first peer-reviewed open access Spanish journal, Relieve, began in 1995. Publishers CSIC Press and Hipatia Press belong to the international Open Access Scholarly Publishers Association.

Repositories 
There are a number of collections of scholarship in Spain housed in digital open access repositories. They contain journal articles, book chapters, data, and other research outputs that are free to read. As of March 2018, the UK-based Directory of Open Access Repositories lists some 131 repositories in Spain. Those with the most digital assets include Revistes Catalanes amb Accés Obert, Tesis Doctorals en Xarxa, GREDOS (of Universidad de Salamanca), Biblioteca Virtual del Patrimonio Bibliográfico (of Ministry of Culture), and Digital CSIC (of Spanish National Research Council). Related to this are SciELO and DialNet.

Most universities in Spain maintain an institutional repository, collectively searchable via the "Recolecta" digital platform.

See also

 Copyright law of Spain
 Education in Spain
 Internet in Spain
 List of libraries in Spain
 Media of Spain
 Open access in other countries
 Redalyc (Red de Revistas Científicas de América Latina y El Caribe, España y Portugal)
 Science and technology in Spain

References

Further reading
in English
 
 
 
  
 

in Spanish

External links
 
  (General information website about the progress of open access in Spain and other Spanish-speaking places)
  (Database of Spanish institutional repositories)
  (Database of journals)
  (Database of policies)
 Lista OS-REPOSITORIOS (listserv about implementation of repositories in Spain)
 
 
 
 
 

Academia in Spain
Communications in Spain
Spain
Science and technology in Spain